Pongolapoort Nature Reserve is a park in the Umkhanyakude District of Kwazulu-Natal, about 30 km southeast of the town Pongola.

Within the nature reserve is the Pongolapoort Dam, also known as the Jozini Dam. Many bird species can be found here.

The construction of the dam reduced flooding but also hurt the fishing industry.

References

Routes.co.za - Pongolapoort Nature Reserve
 

Protected areas of KwaZulu-Natal